Georges Guétary, born Lambros Vorloou  (8 February 1915 – 13 September 1997) was a French singer, dancer, cabaret performer and film actor, best known for his role in the 1951 musical An American in Paris.

Early life and career

Guétary was born in Alexandria, Egypt, to Greek parents. His father was a textile executive. He studied music in Egypt and in Paris, and made his stage debut in 1937. He performed as a singer and dancer with the famed chanteuse Mistinguett at the Casino de Paris.

The British newspaper The Independent said at the time of his death that "part of Guétary's exotic charm, and much of his stage persona as a 'Latin lover' with a voice of creme Chantilly resided in his mischievous innocence combined with an erotic mystery inherent in his ancestry."
 
His first film appearance was in the musical Quand le cœur chante (1938). He also appeared many times at the Théâtre du Châtelet and in numerous other French motion picture and TV films.

He changed his name to Guéthary during World War II to forestall scrutiny from officials who were deporting foreigners to concentration camps. Guétary became a French citizen in 1950.

After the war, Guétary appeared on stage in London and New York. He received critical praise for his performance in London opposite Lizbeth Webb in the 1947 operetta Bless the Bride, which ran for nearly a thousand performances.

On 5 January 1949 Georges Guétary recorded the first version of the song Maître Pierre. This song composed by Henri Betti with the lyrics by Jacques Plante would be a great success performed by many singers and accordionists.

On Broadway, Guétary appeared in Arms and the Girl with Nanette Fabray in 1950. He received a Tony Award for Best Foreign Performer.

An American in Paris and afterwards

Guétary was best known in the United States for his role as Henri Baurel in An American in Paris, in which he plays a friend, and unknowing romantic rival, of the American painter Jerry Mulligan, played by Gene Kelly. In the film, Guétary plays an aging cabaret performer who is in love with a young girl played by Leslie Caron. She falls in love with Mulligan.

Kelly was nearly three years older than Guétary, and the role was originally intended for the much older Maurice Chevalier, who turned down the part. Kelly's biographer, Clive Hirschhorn, said that Kelly recruited Guétary for the part even though he knew that Guétary was too young. In its review, however, Variety said that Guétary was "cast neatly as the older man."

In the film, Guétary is noted for a solo number in which he strides up a stairway singing George Gershwin's Stairway to Paradise. He also appeared with Kelly in a rendition of Gershwin's 'S Wonderful in which both sing, without the other knowing it, about their love for Caron. At the end of the film, the object of their affection, Caron, chooses to go with Kelly despite her affection for Guétary.

Guétary's role in American in Paris turned out to be his only appearance in a Hollywood film. He returned to the stage and films in France. In 1958, he appeared on Broadway in the musical Portofino. New York Times critic Brooks Atkinson said he was "the kissingest philanderer the season has produced."

Guétary was married to Janine Guyon, a producer in French television. They had two children.

Filmography

References

External links

Cabaret singers
French male film actors
French male musical theatre actors
French people of Greek descent
Tony Award winners
1915 births
1997 deaths
Burials at the Cimetière du Grand Jas
20th-century French male actors
20th-century French male singers
Egyptian emigrants to France